Ko Kyŏng-myŏng (1533 – 1592) was a Joseon dynasty scholar and Yangban, who became a Righteous Army leader in the Imjin War. He was killed while attacking Geumsan in 1592.

Background

Ko was a Yangban, from the town of Changhung in Cholla province. He had failed the civil service examinations, and was therefore denied a post in the bureaucracy.

In 1592, the armies of Japanese regent Toyotomi Hideyoshi invaded Korea. They advanced north from Busan and occupied Seoul, forcing King Seonjo to flee. Ko, then sixty years old, began recruiting civilians into a Righteous Army militia. He planned to join forces with another Righteous army led by Cho Hon, and recapture Seoul from the Japanese. While on the way to Seoul, he heard that the Japanese were planning to attack Chonju, capital of Cholla, his home province, from the captured city of Geumsan.

Attack on Geumsan and death
Ko decided to attack the Japanese at Geumsan to prevent them from invading Cholla. He joined forces with Korean regulars led by General Kwak Yong, and marched to Geumsan. The Japanese forces inside the city were led by the Daimyo Kobayakawa Takakage.

While the government forces were driven back, Ko's militia managed to penetrate the outer walls and light buildings on fire. However, the Japanese halted their advance, and they withdrew.

On the second day of fighting, the Japanese forces counterattacked. The government forces and most of the militia fled, but Ko refused to retreat. He was killed along with two of his sons and a small group of fighters in hand-to-hand combat with the Japanese soldiers.

Aftermath
The Japanese army, after repelling the attack on Geumsan, moved to take Jeonju. The ensuing Battle of Jeonju ended with a Korean victory.

One of Ko's surviving sons, Ko Chŏng-hu, became a Righteous army leader. He went on to fight alongside Kim Chon-il in the second siege of Jinju.

References 

People of the Japanese invasions of Korea (1592–1598)
16th-century Korean poets